The 2019 Rally Catalunya (also known as RallyRACC Catalunya - Costa Daurada 2019) was a motor racing event for rally cars which was held over four days between 24 and 27 October 2019. It marks the fifty-fifth running of Rally Catalunya and is the thirteenth round of the 2019 World Rally Championship, the newly-created WRC-2 Pro class, World Rally Championship-2, the Spanish national Rally Championship and Peugeot Rally Cup Ibérica championship.

Nine-time world champions Sébastien Loeb and Daniel Elena were the defending rally winners. Citroën Total WRT, the team they drove for in 2018, were the defending manufacturers' winners. The Finnish crew of Kalle Rovanperä and Jonne Halttunen were the defending rally winners in the World Rally Championship-2 category, but they did not defend their titles as they were promoted to the newly-created WRC-2 Pro class.

Thierry Neuville and Nicolas Gilsoul won the rally for the first time in their career. Their team, Hyundai Shell Mobis WRT, were the manufacturers' winners. The Citroën Total crew of Mads Østberg and Torstein Eriksen won the WRC-2 Pro category, finishing first in the combined WRC-2 category, while the French crew of Eric Camilli and Benjamin Veillas won the wider WRC-2 class.

Ott Tänak and Martin Järveoja finished second overall as well as taking the power stage victory, which is enough for them to seal their maiden World Rally Championship titles. This makes Tänak the first non-French driver to be World Rally Champion since Petter Solberg won the 2003 World Rally Championship title, ending a run of 5,831 days in which a Sébastien was the current champion. With a 2-3 finish in the Pro category, Škoda Motorsport took the first World Rally Championship-2 Pro manufacturers’ title.

Background

Championship standings prior to the event
Ott Tänak and Martin Järveoja led both the drivers' and co-drivers' championships by twenty-eight-points ahead of defending world champions Sébastien Ogier and Julien Ingrassia. Thierry Neuville and Nicolas Gilsoul were third, a further thirteen points behind. In the World Rally Championship for Manufacturers, Hyundai Shell Mobis WRT held an eight-point lead over Toyota Gazoo Racing WRT.

In the World Rally Championship-2 Pro standings, newly-crowned champions Kalle Rovanperä and Jonne Halttunen led by sixty-six points in the drivers' and co-drivers' standings respectively. Gus Greensmith and Elliott Edmondson are second, with Mads Østberg and Torstein Eriksen further five points behind in third. In the manufacturers' championship, Škoda Motorsport led M-Sport Ford WRT by fifty-three points, with Citroën Total over a hundred points behind in third.

In the World Rally Championship-2 standings, Pierre-Louis Loubet and Vincent Landais led the drivers' and co-drivers' standings by six and eight points respectively. Benito Guerra and Maciej Szczepaniak were second, while Kajetan Kajetanowicz and Yaroslav Fedorov were third.

Entry list
The following crews entered into the rally. The event opened to crews competing in the World Rally Championship, World Rally Championship-2, WRC-2 Pro, Spanish national Rally Championship, Peugeot Rally Cup Ibérica championship and privateer entries not registered to score points in any championship. A total of sixty-four entries were received, with eleven crews entered with World Rally Cars and twenty-four entered the World Rally Championship-2. Four crews were nominated to score points in the Pro class.

Route
The La Mussara stage is scheduled to return to the itinerary for the first time since 2014 and due to run as the Power stage on Sunday.

Itinerary
All dates and times are CEST (UTC+2) from 24 to 26 October 2019 and CET (UTC+1) on 27 October 2019.

Report

World Rally Cars
It was a devastating blow for the reigning world champion Sébastien Ogier's title hope. After setting the fastest stage time at the opening stage, the Frenchman's C3 was crawling through the rest of the morning loop due to power steering failure and loss of hydraulics, which lost the six-time world champion nearly three minutes. Citroën's rally went from bad to worse as Esapekka Lappi retired from the rally with engine issues in the afternoon loop. Hyundai ended the first leg in 1-2-3 after all three drivers set impressive times, until Kris Meeke broke the monopoly after the first stage of the second leg. However, his position was short-lived as the Briton understeer into the barrier and retired from the day. Despite Meeke's retirement, the Korean squad's 1-2-3 was still under threat from the title-chasing Ott Tänak, who won four stages on Saturday. The championship leader was flying through the power stage and snatched second from local hero Dani Sordo to seal his maiden WRC title. Thierry Neuville eventually won the rally for the first time in Spain.

Classification

Special stages

Championship standings
Bold text indicates 2019 World Champions.

World Rally Championship-2 Pro
Mads Østberg dominated Friday with an over-40-second lead going into Saturday. However, the Norwegian's lead was under a big threat from the freshly-crowned WRC-2 Pro champion Kalle Rovanperä, until the youngster hit a post in the Salou stage and damaged the rear axle on his Fabia R5. That left Østberg comfortable to win the category.

Classification

Special stages
Results in bold denote first in the RC2 class, the class which both the WRC-2 Pro and WRC-2 championships run to.

Championship standings
Bold text indicates 2019 World Champions.

World Rally Championship-2
Nil Solans took an early lead, but a double puncture dropped the local hero over eight minutes. Championship leader Pierre-Louis Loubet edged Eric Camilli by only 1.5 seconds after Friday, but Camilli surpassed Loubet and built a comfortable lead before the day ended. Championship contender Benito Guerra retired from the rally due to mechanical issues. 

On Sunday, Loubet went off the road and beached his Fabia, which dropped him to fifth. Although the Frenchman still remained on top, his lead was down to just three points. Camilli won the class in the end to give C3 R5 an 1-2 finish in the combined R5 class with Østberg.

Classification

Special stages
Results in bold denote first in the RC2 class, the class which both the WRC-2 Pro and WRC-2 championships run to.

Championship standings

Notes

References

External links

  
 2019 Rally de Catalunya in e-wrc website
 The official website of the World Rally Championship

Spain
2019 in Catalan sport
2019 in Spanish motorsport
October 2019 sports events in Spain
2019